Fukushima Prefecture is a prefecture of Japan located in the Tōhoku region of Honshu. Fukushima Prefecture borders Miyagi Prefecture and Yamagata Prefecture to the north, Niigata Prefecture to the west, Gunma Prefecture to the southwest, and Tochigi Prefecture and Ibaraki Prefecture to the south.

Fukushima is the capital and Iwaki is the largest city of Fukushima Prefecture, with other major cities including Kōriyama, Aizuwakamatsu, and Sukagawa. Fukushima Prefecture is located on Japan's eastern Pacific coast at the southernmost part of the Tōhoku region, and is home to Lake Inawashiro, the fourth-largest lake in Japan. Fukushima Prefecture is the third-largest prefecture of Japan (after Hokkaido and Iwate Prefecture) and divided by mountain ranges into the three regions of Aizu, Nakadōri, and Hamadōri.

History

Prehistory

The keyhole-shaped Ōyasuba Kofun is the largest kofun in the Tohoku region. The site was designated a National Historic Site of Japan in 2000.

Classical and feudal period

Until the Meiji Restoration, the area of Fukushima prefecture was part of what was known as Mutsu Province.

The Shirakawa Barrier and the Nakoso Barrier were built around the 5th century to protect 'the heathens
' from the 'barbarians' to the north. Fukushima became a Province of Mutsu after the Taika Reforms were established in 646.

In 718, the provinces of Iwase and Iwaki were created, but these areas reverted to Mutsu some time between 722 and 724.

The Shiramizu Amidadō is a chapel within the Buddhist temple Ganjō-ji in Iwaki. It was built in 1160 and it is a National Treasure. The temple, including the paradise garden is an Historic Site.

Contemporary period
This region of Japan is also known as Michinoku and Ōshū.

The Fukushima Incident, a political tumult, took place in the prefecture after Mishima Michitsune was appointed governor in 1882.

2011 earthquake and subsequent disasters
On Friday, March 11, 2011, 14:46 JST, a magnitude 9.0 earthquake occurred off the coast of Miyagi Prefecture. Shindo measurements throughout the prefecture reached as high as 6-upper in isolated regions of Hama-dōri on the eastern coast and as low as a 2 in portions of the Aizu region in the western part of the prefecture. Fukushima City, located in Naka-dōri and the capital of Fukushima Prefecture, measured 6-lower.

Following the earthquake there were isolated reports of major damage to structures, including the failure of Fujinuma Dam as well as damage from landslides. The earthquake also triggered a massive tsunami that hit the eastern coast of the prefecture and caused widespread destruction and loss of life. In the two years following the earthquake, 1,817 residents of Fukushima Prefecture had either been confirmed dead or were missing as a result of the earthquake and tsunami.

In the aftermath of the earthquake and tsunami that followed, the outer housings of two of the six reactors at the Fukushima Daiichi Nuclear Power Plant in Ōkuma exploded followed by a partial meltdown and fires at three of the other units. Many residents were evacuated to nearby localities due to the development of a large evacuation zone around the plant. Radiation levels near the plant peaked at 400 mSv/h (millisieverts per hour) after the earthquake and tsunami, due to damage sustained. This resulted in increased recorded radiation levels across Japan. On April 11, 2011, officials upgraded the disaster to a level 7 out of a possible 7, a rare occurrence not seen since the Chernobyl disaster in 1986.
Several months later, officials announced that although the area nearest the melt down were still off limits, areas near the twenty kilometer radial safe zone could start seeing a return of the close to 47,000 residents that had been evacuated.

Geography 

Fukushima is both the southernmost prefecture of Tōhoku region and the prefecture of Tōhoku region that is closest to Tokyo. With an area size of  it is the third-largest prefecture of Japan, behind Hokkaido and Iwate Prefecture. It is divided by mountain ranges into three regions called (from west to east) Aizu, Nakadōri, and Hamadōri.

Fukushima city is located in the Fukushima Basin's southwest area and nearby mountains. Located on the central eastern seaboard a part of the Pacifim rim. A region with high tectonic activity given its location where the Pacific and Eurasian continental plates collide - a part the Ring of Fire. " Aizuwakamatsu is located in the western part of Fukushima Prefecture, in the southeast part of Aizu basin. Lake Inawashiro is the 4th largest lake of Japan in the center of the prefecture.

The coastal Hamadōri region lies on the Pacific Ocean and is the flattest and most temperate region, while the Nakadōri region is the agricultural heart of the prefecture and contains the capital, Fukushima City. The mountainous Aizu region has scenic lakes, lush forests, and snowy winters.

As of April 1, 2012, 13% of the total land area of the prefecture was designated as Natural Parks, namely Bandai-Asahi, Nikkō, and Oze National Parks; Echigo Sanzan-Tadami Quasi-National Park; and eleven Prefectural Natural Parks.

Cities 

Thirteen cities are located in Fukushima Prefecture:

Cityscape

Towns and villages 

These are the towns and villages in each district:

Mergers

List of governors of Fukushima Prefecture (from 1947) 

 Kanichiro Ishihara (石原幹市郎) – April 12, 1947 to November 30, 1949
 Sakuma Otake (大竹作摩) – January 28, 1950 to July 25, 1957
 Zenichiro Sato (佐藤善一郎) – August 25, 1957 to March 23, 1964
 Morie Kimura (木村守江) – May 16, 1964 to August 11, 1976

 Isao Matsudaira (松平勇雄) – September 19, 1976 to September 18, 1988
 Eisaku Satō (佐藤栄佐久) – September 19, 1988 to September 28, 2006
 Yūhei Satō (佐藤 雄平) – November 12, 2006 to November 11, 2014
 Masao Uchibori (内堀 雅雄) – November 12, 2014 to present

Demographics 

A total of 1,833,152 people live in the Fukushima Prefecture.

Economy 

The coastal region traditionally specializes in fishing and seafood industries, and is notable for its electric and particularly nuclear power-generating industry, while the upland regions are more focused on agriculture. Thanks to Fukushima's climate, various fruits are grown throughout the year. These include pears, peaches, cherries, grapes, and apples.  the prefecture produced 20.6% of Japan's peaches and 8.7% of cucumbers.

Fukushima also produces rice, that combined with pure water from mountain run-offs, is used to make sake. Some sakes from the region are considered so tasteful that they are served to visiting royalty and world leaders by hosts.

Lacquerware is another popular product from Fukushima. Dating back over four hundred years, the process of making lacquerware involves carving an object out of wood, then putting a lacquer on it and decorating it. Objects made are usually dishes, vases and writing materials.

Culture 

Legend has it that an ogress, Adachigahara, once roamed the plain after whom it was named. The Adachigahara plain lies close to the city of Fukushima.

Other stories, such as that of a large, strong, red cow that carried wood, influenced toys and superstitions. The Akabeko cow is a small, red papier-mâché cow on a bamboo or wooden frame, and is believed to ease child birth, bring good health, and help children grow up as strong as the cow.

Another superstitious talisman of the region is the Okiagari-koboshi, or self-righting dharma doll. These dolls are seen as bringers of good luck and prosperity because they stand right back up when knocked down.

Miharu-goma are small, wooden, black or white toy horses painted with colorful designs. Depending upon their design, they may be believed to bring things like long life to the owner.

Kokeshi dolls, while less symbolic, are also a popular traditional craft. They are carved wooden dolls, with large round heads and hand painted bodies. Kokeshi dolls are popular throughout many regions of Japan, but Fukushima is credited as their birthplace.

Notable festivals and events 

 Sōma's  is held every summer.

The Nomaoi Festival horse riders dressed in complete samurai attire can be seen racing, chasing wild horses, or having contests that imitate a battle. The history behind the festival and events is over one thousand years old.

 Fukushima's  is held on the first weekend of August

During the Waraji Festival, a large (12-meter, 38-ft) straw sandal built by locals is dedicated to a shrine. There is also a traditional Taiwanese dragon dance, or Ryumai, performed by Taiwanese visitors.

 Aizuwakamatsu's  is held in late September

The Aizu festival is a celebration of the time of the samurai. It begins with a display of sword dancing and fighting, and is followed by a procession of around five hundred people. The people in the procession carry flags and tools representing well-known feudal lords of long ago, and some are actually dressed like the lords themselves.

 Taimatsu Akashi Fire Festival

A reflection of a long ago time of war, the Taimatsu Akashi Festival consists of men and women carrying large symbolic torches lit with a sacred fire to the top of Mt. Gorozan. Accompanied by drummers, the torchbearers reach the top and light a wooden frame representing an old local castle and the samurai that lived there. In more recent years the festival has been opened up so that anyone wanting to participate may carry a small symbolic torch along with the procession.

 Iizaka's  is held in October
 Nihonmatsu's  is held from October 4 to 6
 Nihonmatsu's  is held from October 1 to November 23
 Kōriyama City's Uneme Festival (うねめ祭り）is held early August in honor of the legend of Princess Uneme. The festival features a large parade through the city center with thousands of contestants annually, with several festival floats and a giant taiko-drum.
Date City's Ryozen Taiko Festival (霊山太鼓祭り) is held in August and features multiple troupes of taiko drum players as well as other musical and comedic performances.

Education

Universities 

 Aizuwakamatsu
 Aizu University
 Fukushima
 Fukushima Gakuin University
 Fukushima Medical University
 Fukushima University
 Iwaki
 Higashi Nippon International University
 Iwaki Meisei University
 Koriyama
 Koriyama Women's University
 Nihon University – Koriyama campus
 Ohu University

Tourism 

Tsuruga castle, a samurai castle originally built in the late 14th century, was occupied by the region's governor in the mid-19th century, during a time of war and governmental instability. Because of this, Aizuwakamatsu was the site of an important battle in the Boshin War, during which 19 teenage members of the Byakkotai committed ritual seppuku suicide. Their graves on Mt. Iimori are a popular tourist attraction.

Kitakata is well known for its distinctive Kitakata ramen noodles and well-preserved traditional storehouse buildings, while Ōuchi-juku in the town of Shimogo retains numerous thatched buildings from the Edo period.

Mount Bandai, in the Bandai-Asahi National Park, erupted in 1888, creating a large crater and numerous lakes, including the picturesque 'Five Coloured Lakes' (Goshiki-numa). Bird watching crowds are not uncommon during migration season here. The area is popular with hikers and skiers. Guided snowshoe tours are also offered in the winter.

The Inawashiro Lake area of Bandai-Asahi National Park is Inawashiro-ko, where the parental home of Hideyo Noguchi (1876–1928) can still be found. It was preserved along with some of Noguchi's belongings and letters as part of a memorial. Noguchi is famous not only for his research on yellow fever, but also for having his face on the 1,000 yen note.

The Miharu Takizakura is an ancient weeping higan cherry tree in Miharu, Fukushima. It is over 1,000 years old.

Food 

Fruits. Fukushima is known as a "Fruit Kingdom" because of its many seasonal fruits, and the fact that there is fruit being harvested every month of the year. While peaches are the most famous, the prefecture also produces large quantities of cherries, nashi (Japanese pears), grapes, persimmons, and apples.

Fukushima-Gyu is the prefecture's signature beef. The Japanese Black type cattle used to make Fukushima-Gyu are fed, raised, and processed within the prefecture. Only beef with a grade of 2 or 3 can be labeled as "Fukushima-Gyu" (福島牛）

Ikaninjin is shredded carrot and dried squid seasoned with soy sauce, cooking sake, mirin, etc. It is a local cuisine from the northern parts of Fukushima Prefecture. It is primarily made from the late autumn to winter in the household.

Kitakata Ramen is one of the Top 3 Ramen of Japan, along with Sapporo and Hakata.  The base is a soy-sauce soup, as historically soy sauce was readily available from the many storehouses around the town. Niboshi (sardines), tonkotsu (pig bones) and sometimes chicken and vegetables are boiled to make the stock. This is then topped with chashu (thinly sliced barbeque pork), spring onions, fermented bamboo shoots, and sometimes narutomaki, a pink and white swirl of cured fish cake.

Mamador is the prefecture's most famous confection. The baked good has a milky red bean flavor center wrapped in a buttery dough. The name means “People who drink mothers’ milk" in Spanish. It is produced by the Sanmangoku Company.

Creambox is prefecture's second famous confection. It is a sweet bread with a thick milk bread and white milk-flavored cream. It is sold in Koriyama City at many bakery and school purchases . The selling price is usually around 100 yen, and in some rare cases, the dough is round.
Since it looks simple and does not change much from normal bread when viewed from above, some processing may be performed on the cream, there are things that put almonds or draw the character's face with chocolate

Sake. The Fukushima Prefecture Sake Brewers Cooperative is made up of nearly 60 sake breweries. Additionally, the Annual Japan Sake Awards has awarded the prefecture the most gold prizes of all of Japan for four years running as of 2016.

Transportation

Rail

 AbukumaExpress
 Abukuma Express Line
 Aizu Railway
 Aizu Line
 Fukushima Transportation
 Iizaka Line
 JR East
 Ban'etsu East Line
 Ban'etsu West Line
 Jōban Line
 Suigun Line
 Tadami Line
 Tōhoku Line
 Tōhoku Shinkansen
 Yamagata Line
 Yamagata Shinkansen
 Yagan Railway
 Kinugawa Line

Road

Expressways 

  Ban-etsu Expressway
  Jōban Expressway
  Tōhoku Expressway

National highways 

 
 
  (Fukushima-Yamagata-Shinjo-Yokote-Akita)
 
  (Niigata-Murakami-Nagai-Nanyo-Shiroishi-Soma)
 
  (Soma-Fukushima-Inawashiro)
 
 
 
 
  (Niigata-Tsubame-Uonuma-Tadami-Shirakawa-Iwaki)
 
  (Mito-Hitachiota-Iwaki-Tamura-Nihonmatsu-Date-Shibata)
 
 
 
  (Niigata-Agano-Kitakata-Fukushima-Namie)

Ports

 Onahama Port – International and domestic goods, container hub port in Iwaki

Airports

 Fukushima Airport

Notable people

Junko Tabei, the first woman to reach the summit of Mount Everest, and the first woman to ascend all Seven Summits by climbing the highest peak on every continent
Takeshi Suzuki, an alpine skier and Paralympic athlete.
Yoshihide Muroya, an aerobatics pilot and race pilot
Toshiyuki Nishida, an actor best known for his fishing comedy series, Tsuribaka Nisshi ("The Fishing Maniac's Diary")
Wakatakakage Atsushi, a professional sumo wrestler competing in sumo's top makuuchi division beginning in 2019.
Wakamotoharu Minato, Wakatakakage’s brother and also top division rikishi.
Mazie K. Hirono, US Senator and former Lieutenant Governor for Hawaii, was born in Fukushima Prefecture in 1947, and moved to Hawaii in 1955
Hideyo Noguchi, the doctor who contributed to knowledge in the fight against syphilis and yellow fever. The Japanese government created the Hideyo Noguchi Africa Prize in his honor. This was first awarded in May 2008
Seishiro Okazaki (January 28, 1890 – July 12, 1951) was a Japanese American healer, martial artist, and founder of Danzan-ryū jujitsu. Born in Kakeda, Date County in Fukushima Prefecture, Japan, he immigrated to Hawaii in 1906

See also

 2006 Fukushima gubernatorial election

Notes

References
 Nussbaum, Louis-Frédéric and Käthe Roth. (2005).  Japan encyclopedia. Cambridge: Harvard University Press. ; OCLC 58053128

External links

Fukushima Prefecture Official Website 
 Fukushima Travel - Official Tourism Information 

 
Tōhoku region
Prefectures of Japan